The Louisiana Colonial Trails are a Louisiana Scenic Byway that follows several different state highways, primarily:
LA 6 from the Texas state line to Clarence;
LA 8 from the Texas state line to Jena;
LA 28 from Alexandria to west of Jonesville;
LA 29 from Bunkie to Long Bridge;
LA 107 from Cottonport to Pineville;
LA 115 from Marksville to northeast of Holloway;
LA 124, LA 8, and US 425 in a loop from Jonesville to Ferriday via Sicily Island;
LA 451 in its entirety; and
US 84 from Clarence to the Mississippi state line at Natchez.

References

Louisiana Scenic Byways
Tourist attractions in Avoyelles Parish, Louisiana
Tourist attractions in Catahoula Parish, Louisiana
Tourist attractions in Concordia Parish, Louisiana
Tourist attractions in Grant Parish, Louisiana
Tourist attractions in LaSalle Parish, Louisiana
Tourist attractions in Natchitoches Parish, Louisiana
Tourist attractions in Rapides Parish, Louisiana
Tourist attractions in Sabine Parish, Louisiana
Tourist attractions in Vernon Parish, Louisiana
Tourist attractions in Winn Parish, Louisiana
Scenic highways in Louisiana
U.S. Route 84